Jeroen Verhoeven (born 30 April 1980, in Naarden) is a Dutch former footballer who last played as a goalkeeper for ASV De Dijk in the Dutch Hoofdklasse. He also played for RKC Waalwijk, FC Volendam, AFC Ajax and FC Utrecht in the span of his 17-year career as a professional goalkeeper in the Netherlands.

Career 
He started his career in AFC Ajax's youth academy. He played for FC Volendam between 2002 and 2009. In July 2009, Ajax signed the goalkeeper from Volendam on a three-year deal, meaning Verhoeven returned to Amsterdam after seven years. Ajax deployed him as backup for Maarten Stekelenburg and Kenneth Vermeer. He made his debut for Ajax in the Eredivisie on 24 October 2010, coming on as a second-half substitute for the injured Stekelenburg. In this match he helped his team to a 2–2 draw with Excelsior by making three saves in the closing minutes. In the summer of 2012, Verhoeven was released by Ajax and signed a deal with FC Utrecht, where he served as second goalkeeper behind Robbin Ruiter. In August 2015, he signed a one-year deal with former club FC Volendam. He announced his retirement from professional football on 6 May 2016. On November 28th, 2017 he announced his retirement from football altogether after an injury plagued season with ASV De Dijk playing in the Dutch Hoofdklasse.

Verhoeven was often teased about his large waistline, which is uncharacteristic for a keeper, by opposing fans. In one match against ADO Den Haag during the 2010–11 season, the home supporters showered him with chants of "Pizza!" when he touched the ball.

References

External links 
 Official website 
 Voetbal International profile 

1980 births
Living people
Dutch footballers
Association football goalkeepers
Eredivisie players
Eerste Divisie players
RKC Waalwijk players
FC Volendam players
AFC Ajax players
FC Utrecht players
People from Naarden
ASV De Dijk players
Footballers from North Holland